Genesis is  a modern English name taken from the word meaning "creation" or "beginning", or given in reference to the Book of Genesis.

It has been a well-used name for girls in the United States in recent years, where it has ranked among the top 1,000 names given to newborn girls since 1988, among the top 200 names since 2000 and among the top 100 names given to newborn girls since 2008.  The name, also spelled Génesis, has been particularly popular for girls born to Hispanic parents. Genesis was among the five most popular names for Hispanic newborn girls in the American state of Virginia in 2022. The name has also ranked among the top 100 names for girls in Chile in recent years.

People
Genesis Be, American recording artist, painter, and activist
Génesis Carmona (1991–2014), Venezuelan fashion model, beauty queen, and college student killed while protesting the government of Venezuela
Genesis Cornejo-Alvarado (died 2017), American teenage murder victim
Génesis Dávila (born 1990), Puerto Rican American model and beauty pageant title holder
Génesis Franchesco (born 1990), Venezuelan female volleyball player
Genesis Lynea (born 1989), Bermudian-born British actress, dancer, and singer
Génesis Reasco (born 1998), Ecuadoran freestyle wrestler
Genesis Rodriguez (born 1987), American actress and model
 Génesis Rodríguez Gomez (born 1994), Venezuelan weightlifter
Génesis Romero (born 1995), Venezuelan athlete specializing in the 100 meter hurdles and long jump
Génesis Valentín (born 1998), Puerto-Rican American badminton player

See also

Genesis Owusu (born 1998), stage name of Kofi Owusu-Ansah (born 1998), Ghanaian-born Australian singer
Genesis P-Orridge (1950-2020), born Neil Megson, British-born singer-songwriter, musician, poet, performance artist, visual artist, and occultist

Notes